Konstantinos Kourtesiotis (born 5 June 1984) is a Greek professional footballer who plays as a left-back for Super League 2 club Apollon Larissa.

Career
Kourtesiotis was born in Karditsa, and has previously played for his hometown team Anagennisi. He has also played for Ilisiakos, Tyrnavos 2005 , and for the Cretan Superleague club Platanias. He signed for AEL on July 17, 2014.

External links
 OnSports Profile (Greek)
 Myplayer Profile (Greek)
 Athletic Larissa Interview (Greek)
 Aelole (Greek)
 Video (Goal Vs Zakynthos)

1984 births
Living people
Greek footballers
Association football defenders
Anagennisi Karditsa F.C. players
Ilisiakos F.C. players
Athlitiki Enosi Larissa F.C. players
Footballers from Karditsa